Mohamed Magdy Farid (Arabic: محمد مجدي فريد, born 18 August 1982) is an Egyptian Classic Liberal politician, He has been a Senator since 2020.  He is the Deputy of the Social Solidarity Committee and Human Rights in the Senate of Egypt. and a member of the Youth Coordination for Parties and Politicians.

Education 
Farid holds a bachelor's degree in industrial and management engineering from October 6 University, and a master's degree in Sustainable development Planning with a specialization in Economic Development from the Egyptian National Planning Institute. He holds certificates in leadership, management and capacity building. He is a DBA researcher in financial management.

Political work 
Farid was a founding member of the Free Egyptians Party and was included in the party work from membership in the secretariats of training, education and foreign relations through membership of the Political Bureau, and the last position he held was the secretary of the Republic's Youth and vice president of the Economic Committee before his resignation in early 2017. He Participated in the economic committee of the National Salvation Front in Egypt. He was a member of the Executive Office of the Arab Youth Alliance, A member of the Executive Office of the Egyptian and Danish Parties Network, A member of the Coordination of Youth Parties and Politicians He is also Founding member of the liberal club in Cairo.

He participated in many international and regional conferences and events.

Syndication 
Farid is a member of the Mechanical Engineering Division from 2014, A member of the Supreme Council of the Egyptian Engineers Syndicate for the two sessions (2014–2016) and (2020–2022)

He was a member of the Investment and Finance Committees of the General Syndicate of Engineers from 2014 to 2016.

Representative work 
He was appointed to the Egyptian Senate by decision of President of Egypt Abdel Fattah el-Sisi on 16 October 2020. He took the oath of office for Senate membership on Sunday, 18 October 2020.

External Links 

 Mohamed M. Farid on Twitter
 Mohamed M. Farid on Facebook

References

Living people
1982 births
21st-century Egyptian politicians
October 6 University alumni